Route 99 is a short highway in southern Missouri.  Its northern terminus is at U.S. Route 60 just north of Birch Tree in Shannon County; its southern terminus is at U.S. Route 160 south of Thomasville in Oregon County  to the SSE. It crosses the Eleven Point River at Thomasville. Just south of Thomasville Route 99 provides access to the west end of the Eleven Point Wild and Scenic River portion of the Mark Twain National Forest.

Major intersections

References

099
Transportation in Oregon County, Missouri
Transportation in Shannon County, Missouri